The Battle of Nöteborg in July 1656 was a naval battle between 250 smaller Russian ships, who had surrounded the city of Nöteborg, and 50 smaller Swedish ships under the command of Carl Gustaf Wrangel during the Russo-Swedish War (1656–58). Few details are known, but it was a Swedish victory.

Sources

Nöteborg 
Nöteborg 
Second Northern War
Conflicts in 1656
1656 in Europe
Leningrad Oblast